Illinois Route 170 is a north–south state road in north-central Illinois. It runs from Illinois Route 23 well north of Pontiac to U.S. Route 6 in Seneca.

Route description 

Illinois 170 is a rural, two-lane surface road for its entire length. The road crosses Illinois River via a four-span truss bridge. As of May 5, 2006, the Illinois Department of Transportation is looking to replace the 74-year-old bridge.  The old bridge was imploded on November 18, 2010.

History 
SBI Route 160 originally ran from Red Bud to Sparta; this became Illinois Route 154 in 1937. In 1946, it replaced Illinois Route 186 (previously Illinois Route 70A) from Seneca south to Illinois Route 17 near Budd. In 1995 Illinois 170 was extended further south to Illinois 23.

Major Intersections

References 

170
Transportation in Livingston County, Illinois
Transportation in LaSalle County, Illinois